Acidophiles or acidophilic organisms are those that thrive under highly acidic conditions (usually at pH 5.0 or below). These organisms can be found in different branches of the tree of life, including Archaea, Bacteria, and Eukarya.

Examples

A list of these organisms includes:

Archaea
 Sulfolobales, an order in the Thermoproteota branch of Archaea
 Thermoplasmatales, an order in the Euryarchaeota branch of Archaea
 ARMAN, in the Euryarchaeota branch of Archaea
 Acidianus brierleyi, A. infernus, facultatively anaerobic thermoacidophilic archaebacteria
 Halarchaeum acidiphilum, acidophilic member of the Halobacteriacaeae
 Metallosphaera sedula, thermoacidophilic

Bacteria
 Acidobacteriota, a phylum of Bacteria
 Acidithiobacillales, an order of Pseudomonadota e.g. A. ferrooxidans, A. thiooxidans
Thiobacillus prosperus, T. acidophilus, T. organovorus, T. cuprinus
Acetobacter aceti, a bacterium that produces acetic acid (vinegar) from the oxidation of ethanol.
Alicyclobacillus, a genus of bacteria that can contaminate fruit juices.

Eukarya
 Mucor racemosus
 Urotricha
 Dunaliella acidophila
 Members of the algal class Cyanidiophyceae, including Cyanidioschyzon merolae

Mechanisms of adaptation to acidic environments

Most acidophile organisms have evolved extremely efficient mechanisms to pump protons out of the intracellular space in order to keep the cytoplasm at or near neutral pH. Therefore, intracellular proteins do not need to develop acid stability through evolution. However, other acidophiles, such as Acetobacter aceti, have an acidified cytoplasm which forces nearly all proteins in the genome to evolve acid stability. For this reason, Acetobacter aceti has become a valuable resource for understanding the mechanisms by which proteins can attain acid stability.

Studies of proteins adapted to low pH have revealed a few general mechanisms by which proteins can achieve acid stability.  In most acid stable proteins (such as pepsin and the soxF protein from Sulfolobus acidocaldarius), there is an overabundance of acidic residues which minimizes low pH destabilization induced by a buildup of positive charge. Other mechanisms include minimization of solvent accessibility of acidic residues or binding of metal cofactors. In a specialized case of acid stability, the NAPase protein from Nocardiopsis alba was shown to have relocated acid-sensitive salt bridges away from regions that play an important role in the unfolding process. In this case of kinetic acid stability, protein longevity is accomplished across a wide range of pH, both acidic and basic.

See also
 Acidophiles in acid mine drainage
 Acidophobe
 Neutrophile
 Acidophile (histology)

References

Further reading
 
 
 
 
 
 

Physiology